Nsuta-Kwamang is one of the constituencies represented in the Parliament of Ghana. It elects one Member of Parliament (MP) by the first past the post system of election.

Adelaide Ntim is the member of parliament for the constituency. She was elected on the ticket of the New Patriotic Party (NPP).

See also 
 List of Ghana Parliament constituencies

References 

Parliamentary constituencies in the Ashanti Region